The .38/.45 Clerke (pronounced "clark"), aka .38/.45 Auto Pistol, .45/.38 Auto Pistol, or 45/.38 Hard Head, is a wildcat semi-automatic pistol cartridge developed by Bo Clerke and introduced in Guns & Ammo in 1963.

History and design
It is essentially a .45 ACP case, necked down to .357, resulting in a cartridge similar in form to the earlier 7.65×21mm Parabellum and 7.63×25mm Mauser cartridges. It was created to be a low recoil target cartridge that would function reliably with multiple bullet types, FMJ to cast lead wadcutters without the feeding problems that straight walled pistol rounds sometimes exhibit. The cartridge can be used in standard .45 ACP magazines.

Ammunition and reloading
.45 ACP cases can be resized to handload .38/.45 Auto cartridges

using form and sizer dies still available from the RCBS Corporation, p/n 56468.

Nearly any M1911 pistol and pistols of the same pattern can be converted to the .38/.45 cartridge with a replacement barrel, from a 38 Super barrel reamed out to .38/.45 dimensions. During the round's initial popularity, drop-in barrels were available from makers like Bar-Sto.

Related rounds
 .45 ACP
 .38 Super
 .400 Cor-Bon
 .357 SIG
 7.63×25mm Mauser
 .38 Casull

See also
 List of handgun cartridges

References

External links
  .38/.45 Clerke on Practical Machinist

Pistol and rifle cartridges
Wildcat cartridges